Carthel is a surname. Notable people with the surname include:

Colby Carthel (born 1976), American football coach
Don Carthel (born 1952), American football coach, father of Colby